Dicky Ralph (21 January 1908 – 5 October 1989) was a Welsh international rugby fly-half who played rugby union for Newport and rugby league with Leeds and Batley. He won six caps for Wales at rugby union, and also represented Wales at rugby league.

International career
Ralph was first capped for Wales against France on 28 February 1931 under the captaincy of Jack Bassett. The game was a walkover, with Wales winning 35-3, Ralph scored two tries of the seven scored by the Welsh team that day and unsurprisingly was reselected two weeks later to face Ireland. In a bruising encounter, Wales won at Ravenhill, with Ralph again on the score sheet, this time with a drop goal. Later that year he faced Bennie Osler's touring South African team twice, once with Newport, and then again in December as part of the Welsh team. Ralph appeared on the losing team on both occasions, though played some strong rugby during the international and his screw kicking on the day was excellent.

In the 1932 Home Nations Championship, Ralph was back in the squad, alongside his Newport team mate Jack Morley. Ralph played all three games, scoring against Ireland with a try and a drop goal. Ralph may have gained further caps, but switched codes to rugby league in 1933, joining Leeds. On 30 December 1933 Ralph played for the Wales rugby league team in an encounter with Australia, becoming a dual-code international.

International matches played
Wales (rugby union)
 1932
 1931
 1931, 1932
 1932
 1931

Wales (rugby league)
 1933

Bibliography

References

External links

1908 births
1989 deaths
Batley Bulldogs players
Dual-code rugby internationals
Leeds Rhinos players
London Welsh RFC players
Newport RFC players
Rugby league players from Caerphilly County Borough
Rugby union fly-halves
Rugby union players from Abercarn
Wales international rugby union players
Wales national rugby league team players
Welsh rugby league players
Welsh rugby union players